Charles Laeser (Geneva, 12 September 1879 — Geneva, 28 July 1959) was a Swiss professional road bicycle racer. Laeser entered 1903 Tour de France, the first edition of the race. He did not finish the third stage, but according to the rules then, he was still allowed to start the next stage. He started and even won the fourth stage, thus becoming the first foreign Tour de France stage winner. Laeser also entered the 1904 Tour de France, but did finish any stage.

Major results

1903
1903 Tour de France:
Winner stage 4

External links 

Official Tour de France results for Charles Laeser

Swiss male cyclists
1879 births
1959 deaths
Swiss Tour de France stage winners
Cyclists from Geneva